Clifford Wallace "Kip" Niven (May 27, 1945 – May 6, 2019) was an American actor and theatre director.

Early life 
Niven was born in Kansas City and grew up in Prairie Village, Kansas, the son of William Watson Niven and Elizabeth Hopkins Niven. He graduated from Shawnee Mission East High School and briefly attended Baylor University, before graduating from University of Kansas. After university, he joined the Army, serving three years, including a tour in Vietnam.

Career 
In 1972, Niven was featured in the premiere episode of The Sixth Sense. In 1973, he joined David Soul, Robert Urich and Tim Matheson as one of the four rogue cops in Magnum Force, starring Clint Eastwood. He amassed nearly 100 credits in film and television, enjoying recurring roles on TV series such as The Waltons, Alice and Emergency!.

Personal life 
Niven's first wife, Susan Tisdall Niven, whom he married in 1968 and with whom he had two children, died in a car accident in 1981. In 1982, he married actress Linda Lavin. They divorced in 1992. In 1994, Niven married Beth Reiff, with whom he had a daughter. They remained together until her death in 2012.

Death 
Niven died of a heart attack on May 6, 2019 in Leawood, Kansas, aged 73.

Filmography

References

External links 
 

1945 births
2019 deaths
20th-century American male actors
21st-century American male actors
American male film actors
American male stage actors
American male television actors
American theatre directors
Male actors from Kansas City, Missouri
People from Leawood, Kansas
People from Prairie Village, Kansas
United States Army personnel of the Vietnam War
University of Kansas alumni